Golmaal is a 1998 Tamil-language comedy film directed by Selva, making his directorial debut. The film stars Selva himself and newcomer Monica Nerukkar, with Rajan P. Dev, K. S. Ravikumar, Dhamu, Sathya Prakash, Mahanadi Shankar, Bhanu Prakash playing supporting roles. It was released on 5 June 1998.

Plot

Ganesh, a good-for-nothing youth, falls in love with Aishwarya. Her father Colonel Rajappa is a very strict father who hates love. Ganesh and Aishwarya decide to elope but her father later has a heart attack and Aishwarya refuses to marry him. Colonel Rajappa's state of health deteriorates, therefore he arranges his daughter's wedding as soon as possible. Three terrorists escape from jail. While preparing Aishwarya's wedding in Karnal Rajappa's house, Ganesh enters in her room and tries to convince her. In the meantime, the three terrorists enter their house and begin to sequester them. These terrorists are ultimately Ganesh's friends and it was Ganesh's plan to marry his lover Aishwarya. What transpires later forms the crux of the story.

Cast

Production 
Selva turned director with this film, which would be his last before a hiatus.

Soundtrack

The film score and the soundtrack were composed by Bala Bharathi. The soundtrack, released in 1998, features 4 tracks with lyrics written by Arivumathi, Vasan and Thirumaran.

References

1998 films
Indian comedy films
1990s Tamil-language films
1998 directorial debut films
1998 comedy films